Albert Stanhope Elmore (1827–1909) served as the 11th Secretary of State of Alabama in 1865.

Before he was appointed Secretary of State, he was elected major of the State militia in 1847 and served as assistant clerk in the Alabama House of Representatives from 1853 to 1854 and from 1855 to 1864.

He got married in 1853 and had seven children.

References

1827 births
1909 deaths
Secretaries of State of Alabama